Virtual Hiryū No Ken is a fighting video game released for the Sony PlayStation, which was designed by Culture Brain and published by Natsume. The game is basically a prequel to Hiryū no Ken Twin (Flying Dragon, Version 1.5) for Nintendo 64.

References

1997 video games
3D fighting games
Culture Brain games
Hiryu no Ken
Japan-exclusive video games
PlayStation (console) games
Fighting games
Multiplayer and single-player video games
Video games developed in Japan